In economics, a winner-take-all market is a market in which a product or service that is favored over the competitors, even if only slightly, receives a disproportionately large share of the revenues for that class of products or services. It occurs when the top producer of a product earns a lot more than their competitors. Examples of winner-take-all markets include the sports and entertainment markets. 

The distribution of rewards for different amounts of work determines the degree to which a market is considered winner-take-all. For example, most lottery games are 100% winner-take-all systems because one person takes the entire reward and the rest receive nothing. On the other hand, most manual work, such as picking apples, is the opposite of a winner-take-all system. In this apple-picking example, the reward is  proportional to the amount picked — a person who picks only one box of apples still gets rewarded proportionally. There are also intermediate cases. For example, in Olympic competition, only the top three individuals or teams are rewarded with medals, but other finishers receive lesser rewards such as bragging rights and publicity.

Although some markets (such as lottery games) are designed to be winner-take-all, there are some markets that evolve to become winner-take-all. For example, the piano market was not winner-take-all before rail transportation, whose growing availability and popularity resulted in leading piano makers became progressively larger and capturing more of the piano market, while smaller competitors disappeared over time. (See the Matthew effect, in which "the rich get richer and the poor get poorer".)

The term "winner-take-all" as applied to economic markets was popularized by a 1996 book by Robert H. Frank and Philip J. Cook.

References

External links
 Winner-Takes-All Market

Free market